OFD Ostfriesischer-Flug-Dienst GmbH (German for East Frisian Flight Service), usually shortened to OFD, is a German regional airline headquartered in Emden and based at Emden Airport. It mainly operates charter and scheduled flights between the German North Sea coast and the East Frisian Islands, as well as to the island of Helgoland.

History

The history of OFD reaches back to its predecessor, which was founded in November 1958 as Ostfriesische Lufttaxi - Dekker und Janssen OHG - or OLT for short - to offer ad-hoc charters and sightseeing flights in East Frisia. By 1961, the demand had increased heavily and by 1968, OLT was the largest German regional airline. During the 1970s, as new investors were found, OLT expanded its services with scheduled flights between German cities such as Münster/Osnabrück-Frankfurt.

From the late 1970s to the 1990s, the growing company has been reorganised several times to reflect their different fields of activity and new ownerships. In September 2011, as the scheduled flights section of OLT was sold to Polish investors (and since went bankrupt), all island services were transferred into the independent company OFD which it is since.

Destinations

As of January 2022, OFD serves the following scheduled domestic destinations in the German North Sea area:

 Borkum - Borkum Airfield
 Cuxhaven - Nordholz-Spieka Airfield (until May 2021 Sea-Airport Cuxhaven/Nordholz)
 Emden - Emden Airport base
 Heide - Heide-Büsum Airport
 Helgoland - Heligoland Airfield
 Uetersen - Uetersen Airfield Seasonal

Fleet
As of May 2022, the OFD fleet consists of the following aircraft:

 5 Britten-Norman Islander
 1 GippsAero GA8 Airvan

References

External links

Official website

Airlines established in 1958
Airlines of Germany
1958 establishments in Germany